Jordan competed at the 2013 World Championships in Athletics in Moscow, Russia, from 10–18 August 2013. A team of one athlete was announced to represent the country in the event.

See also
Jordan at other World Championships in 2013
 Jordan at the 2013 UCI Road World Championships
 Jordan at the 2013 World Aquatics Championships

References

External links
IAAF World Championships – Jordan

Nations at the 2013 World Championships in Athletics
World Championships in Athletics
Jordan at the World Championships in Athletics